The Vostok-K ( meaning "East"), GRAU index 8K72K was an expendable carrier rocket used by the Soviet Union for thirteen launches between 1960 and 1964, six of which were crewed. It was derived from the earlier Vostok-L; however, it featured uprated engines to improve performance, and enlarge its payload capacity. It was a member of the Vostok family of rockets.

The Vostok-K made its maiden flight on 22 December 1960, three weeks after the retirement of the Vostok-L. The third stage engine failed 425 seconds after launch, and the payload, a Korabl-Sputnik spacecraft, failed to reach orbit. The spacecraft was recovered after landing, and the two dogs aboard the spacecraft survived the flight.

On 12 April 1961, a Vostok-K rocket was used to launch Vostok 1, the first human spaceflight, making Yuri Gagarin the first human to fly in space. All six crewed missions of the Vostok programme were launched using Vostok-K rockets. The first two Zenit reconnaissance satellites were also launched with the Vostok-K, but it was soon replaced in that capacity with the uprated 8A92 booster. After the conclusion of the Vostok program, there were two remaining 8K72Ks left; these were used to launch four Elektron scientific satellites on 30 January and 10 July 1964.

References 

Vostok program
Space launch vehicles of the Soviet Union
R-7 (rocket family)